The 1962 Swedish speedway season was the 1962 season of motorcycle speedway in Sweden.

Individual

Individual Championship
The 1962 Swedish Individual Speedway Championship final was held on 21 September in Gothenburg. Ove Fundin won the Swedish Championship for the fourth time.

Swedish Junior Championship
 
Winner - Stan Karlsson

Team

Team Championship
Dackarna won division 1 and were declared the winners of the Swedish Speedway Team Championship for the fourth time.

The league system changed from two regional second divisions to a second and third division. 

Getingarna won the second division and Gamarna won the third division.

See also 
 Speedway in Sweden

References

Speedway leagues
Professional sports leagues in Sweden
Swedish
Seasons in Swedish speedway